Judith Reesa Baskin (born 1950)  is a religious studies scholar at the University of Oregon in the United States. She is Associate Dean for Humanities, Director of the Harold Schnitzer Family Program in Judaic Studies, and the Philip H. Knight Professor of Humanities. She held positions at the University of Massachusetts Amherst, Yale University, and State University of New York at Albany, prior to accepting a faculty position at the University of Oregon in 2000. She was appointed Associate Dean for Humanities in the College of Arts and Sciences in July, 2009.

Early life and education
Judith Reesa Baskin was born in 1950 in Hamilton, Ontario, Canada, the daughter of Bernard and Marjorie Ann (née Shatz) Baskin.

She earned a baccalaureate degree in 1971 from Antioch College, including a year abroad at Hebrew University of Jerusalem. Yale University awarded her a Doctor of Philosophy degree in Medieval Studies in 1976.

She is married to Warren Stuart Ginsberg, and the two have a son and daughter.

Career 
From 1976–1988 Baskin taught at the University of Massachusetts Amherst. In 1991, early in her academic career, she wrote she saw her work adding to "general knowledge of the diversity and richness of Jewish women's pasts".

From 1988–2000 she taught at the University at Albany, SUNY, and served as Chair of the Department of Judaic Studies.

Baskin has written and edited books on topics in Jewish history and culture:
 
 
 
 
 Editor, The Cambridge Dictionary of Judaism and Jewish Culture (2011)
 Co-editor with Shelly Tenenbaum, Gender and Jewish Studies: A Curriculum Guide (1994) 
 Co-editor with Kenneth Seeskin, The Cambridge Guide to Jewish History, Religion, and Culture (2010), 2010 National Jewish Book Award winner, first place in anthologies and collections

Selected honors and awards 
Baskin served as President of the Association for Jewish Studies from 2004 through 2006, and is listed as an "Honorary Director" of the association.

Hebrew Union College-Jewish Institute of Religion, Los Angeles campus, awarded Baskin a Doctor of Humane Letters, honoris causa, in 2012. The citation noted, "An academic leader, prize-winning teacher and prolific author, Dr. Baskin has taken a scholarly approach to the place of Jewish women in historical perspective."

Baskin's record of scholarship and research has earned other honors:
 1971–76, Danforth Foundation Fellow
 1971, Woodrow Wilson Fellow (Honorary)
 1980, American Council of Learned Societies: Semester Research Grant for Recent Recipients of the Ph.D.
 1993, Chancellor's Award for Excellence in Teaching, SUNY system
 1995, Collins Fellow (awarded for Outstanding Service, University at Albany)
 2002–present, Philip H. Knight Professor of Humanities, University of Oregon
 2010, National Jewish Book Award, co-editor with Kenneth Seeskin, The Cambridge Survey of Jewish History, Religion, and Culture

See also
 Jewish Encyclopedia

References

External links

1950 births
American women historians
Jewish American writers
Antioch College alumni
Educators from Oregon
American women educators
Jewish encyclopedists
Living people
University of Oregon faculty
University at Albany, SUNY faculty
Writers from Hamilton, Ontario
Yale Graduate School of Arts and Sciences alumni
21st-century American Jews
21st-century American women